Cornetti alla crema a.k.a. Cream Horn and Creampuffs is a 1981 commedia sexy all'italiana, directed by Sergio Martino.

Edwige Fenech, Lino Banfi and Milena Vukotic are featured in a comedic tale about a couple attempting to elude the woman's jealous boyfriend, a professional football player, as well as the man's wife.

Plot
Italy, 1980s. Domenico (Lino Banfi), a tailor who tailors clothes to fit priests and prelates, married and a father, meets the glamorous and prosperous Marianna (Edwige Fenech), an aspiring opera singer. Attracted by the beauty of the girl, he tries to seduce her.

Cast 
 Lino Banfi: Domenico Petruzzelli
 Edwige Fenech: Marianna Tribalzi
 Gianni Cavina: Gabriele Arcangeli
 Milena Vukotic: Elena
 Marisa Merlini: Marianna's mother
 Armando Brancia: Eminenza
 Maurizio Tocchi: Ulrico 
 Luigi Leoni: Don Giacinto 
 Michela Miti: Una Squillo

Release
The film was released in Italy on 12 September 1981

References

External links 
 

1981 films
1980s Italian-language films
Films set in Rome
Films shot in Rome
Films shot in Veneto
Films directed by Sergio Martino
Films scored by Detto Mariano
1980s sex comedy films
Commedia sexy all'italiana
1981 comedy films
1980s Italian films